Mnesiloba eupitheciata is a moth of the family Geometridae. It is known from eastern Australia.

Taxonomy
Mnesiloba dentifascia was treated as a synonym of Mnesiloba eupitheciata, but was later re-instated as a valid species.

References

Moths described in 1863
Eupitheciini